Vivian Furmidge (7 December 1893 – 24 May 1974) was a South African cricketer. He played in twelve first-class matches from 1920/21 to 1929/30.

References

External links
 

1893 births
1974 deaths
South African cricketers
Eastern Province cricketers
Griqualand West cricketers
People from Makhanda, Eastern Cape
Cricketers from the Eastern Cape